The 2017 season is Buriram United's 6th season in the Thai League T1. The club enters the season as the Thai League 4th place, and will participate in the 2017 Thai League T1. They enter this season looking to rebound from a disappointing previous season. The club will also participate in the FA Cup, League Cup and Mekong Club Championship, but will not participate in the Champions Cup and AFC Champions League.

Club

Coaching staff

Other information

Squad information

First team squad

Transfers

In

1st leg

2nd leg

Out

1st leg

2nd leg

Loan in

1st leg

2nd leg

Loan out

1st leg

2nd leg
No player loaned out

Kit
Supplier: BRUTD Kit Manufacturer / Sponsor: Chang

Pre-season and friendlies

Competitions

Overview

Mekong Club Championship

Thai League T1

League table

Results summary

Results by matchday

Matches
The fixtures for 1st leg of the 2017 season were announced on 12 January 2017, and those for 2nd leg were revealed on 22 May 2017.

FA Cup

League Cup

Statistics

Top scorers
The list is sorted by shirt number when total goals are equal.

Clean sheets
The list is sorted by shirt number when total appearances are equal.

Summary

Home attendance

Notes

References

External links
 Buriram United official website
 Toyota Thai League website

Bur
2017